Blood Sweat and Years is the second album by the American rapper JT Money. It was released in May 1, 2001 through Priority Records. 

Blood Sweat and Years wasn't as successful as Money's previous album, peaking at No. 48 on the Billboard 200 and No. 9 on the Top R&B/Hip-Hop Albums. A single, "Hi-Lo", made it to No. 64 on the Hot R&B/Hip-Hop Singles & Tracks.

Production
The album was produced by Dallas Austin, Sam Sneed, and C. Stewart.

Critical reception
AllMusic wrote that "JT Money will never be mistaken for a lyrical giant like Rakim, but the fact that his lyrics are subpar will mean little to clubgoers who will appreciate the album for exactly what it is—an invitation to get on the dancefloor." The A.V. Club stated that the album finds JT "largely abandoning the pimped-out act that made his debut so entertaining in favor of a dour mixture of straightforward gangsta rap, tinny club anthems, and autobiographical storytelling." The Morning Call thought that "Money gets one very important thing right: Party rap should be about the crowd, not the rapper or his empire."

Track listing
"Blood, Sweat and Years"- 1:11  
"War"- 4:40  
"Hi-Lo"- 4:09  
"Spanish Climax"- 1:02  
"Sosa on that Chocha"- 4:08  
"Where My Thugs At"- 4:39  
"Superbitch"- 3:43  
"What Y'all Niggaz Want?"- 4:03  
"Butsta and Haters"- 4:09  
"Lil' Charlie"- 4:39  
"Pimpburger"- 1:19  
"I Like the Way"- 3:42  
"Niggaz Better Run"- 3:52  
"Father to Son"- 4:15  
"Blood, Sweat and Years" (Outro)- 2:10

References

2001 albums
JT Money albums
Priority Records albums